The Icebreaker is an EP by American indie band Cursive. It was released in 1998 after the release of the band's first full length, Such Blinding Stars For Starving Eyes.

Most of the songs were later put on the compilation, The Difference Between Houses and Homes in 2005.

Track listing

Personnel
 Tim Kasher – vocals, guitar
 Steve Pedersen – guitar
 Matt Maginn – bass
 Clint Schnase – drums

References 

Cursive (band) EPs
1998 EPs
Saddle Creek Records EPs